Otávio is a Portuguese masculine given name, the equivalent of English Octavian, Octavius or Italian Ottavio. The Portuguese long form Octávio occurs more rarely. The Portuguese diminutive form is Otavinho.

Given name
Otávio (footballer, born 1994), Brazilian footballer who plays as a midfielder for Atlético Mineiro
Otávio (footballer, born 1995) (1995), Portuguese footballer
Otávio (footballer, born 2002) (2002), Brazilian footballer
Otávio Braga, Otávio Augusto, (1973) Brazilian footballer 
Otávio Augusto (1945) is a Brazilian film actor
Otávio Dutra Brazilian footballer who currently plays for Gresik United in Indonesia
"Lucas Otávio" Lucas Otávio Veiga Lopes (1994) Brazilian footballer
Otávio Good, American computer programmer and CEO of Quest Visual Inc.
"José Otávio", Brazilian bodyboarder
Otávio Della (1969) Brazilian tennis player 
Otávio Fantoni (1907–1935) Brazilian footballer
Otávio Juliano (1972) Brazilian filmmaker
Otávio Souza, Brazilian Jiu Jitsu competitor
Otávio Frias Filho (1957), editor of Folha de S.Paulo
Otávio Gabus Mendes (1906–1946) Brazilian film critic
Nathan Otávio Ribeiro (1990), known simply as Nathan, naturalized Qatari footballer who plays for Al Rayyan in Qatar
Mitsuyo Maeda, Brazilian naturalized as Otávio Maeda, Japanese judōka and prizefighter
Murder of Otávio Jordão da Silva (died 2013), Brazilian amateur football referee who fatally stabbed a player during a match and then was killed by the player's relatives
Otávio de Faria (1908–1980)  Brazilian journalist and writer
Murilo Otávio Mendes (1995)  Brazilian footballer who plays for S.C. Olhanense
Luiz Otávio Santos de Araújo, "Tinga" (1990), Brazilian footballer
Octávio
 Octávio Trompowsky, Brazilian chess player
 Marco Octávio informal name of Brazilian beach soccer coach
 Octávio Mateus, Portuguese paleontologist

References

Portuguese masculine given names